The 2021 Food City Dirt Race was a NASCAR Cup Series race held on March 29, 2021, at Bristol Motor Speedway in Bristol, Tennessee. Contested over 250 laps on the  short track, it was the seventh race of the 2021 NASCAR Cup Series season. The normal concrete racing surface at Bristol was covered with 2,300 truckloads of red clay, reducing the banking from 28 to 19 degrees, and making for the Cup Series' first race on dirt since 1970.

Report

Background

Bristol Motor Speedway, formerly known as Bristol International Raceway and Bristol Raceway, is a NASCAR short track venue located in Bristol, Tennessee. Constructed in 1960, it held its first NASCAR race on July 30, 1961. Despite its short length, Bristol is among the most popular tracks on the NASCAR schedule because of its distinct features, which include extraordinarily steep banking, an all concrete surface, two pit roads, and stadium-like seating.

In 2021, the race shifted to a dirt surface version of the track and was renamed the Food City Dirt Race. On January 25, 2021, NASCAR announced the stage lengths of all events in all three series. According to the stage lengths, it states the race will consist of 250 laps.

Entry list
 (R) denotes rookie driver.
 (i) denotes driver who are ineligible for series driver points.

Practice

First practice

Final practice

Qualifying heat races
Qualifying heat races were cancelled due to weather.  As a result, NASCAR used the standard competition-based formula used in races where practice and qualifying are not being conducted for pandemic safety reasons.  Denny Hamlin will start first as the control car, as Kyle Larson, who had the top score under the competition-based formula from the previous week, was penalised for an engine change in Friday practice over concerns of overheating in second practice.

Starting Lineup

Race
The race was delayed to Monday after rain caused flooding in the area. Logano won the race. There were some visibility problems because of dust and mud. Larson and Bell were the pre-race favorites but crashed out. Truex won the first stage and Suárez led in the second before being passed by Logano. The race was extended following a late caution-period. Hamlin was slow at the final restart and Truex had a flat tire, allowing Stenhouse to come second. Suárez was fourth behind Hamlin and ahead of Newman. During the race it was announced that the race would again be held on dirt during the 2022 NASCAR Cup Series.

Stage Results

Stage One
Laps: 100

Stage Two
Laps: 100

Final Stage Results

Stage Three
Laps: 50

Race statistics
 Lead changes: 5 among 5 different drivers
 Cautions/Laps: 10 for 37
 Red flags: 1 for 6 minutes and 30 seconds
 Time of race: 2 hours, 43 minutes and 53 seconds
 Average speed:

Media

Television
The Food City Dirt Race was carried by Fox in the United States. Mike Joy, five-time Bristol winner Jeff Gordon and Clint Bowyer called the race from the broadcast booth. Jamie Little, Regan Smith and Vince Welch handled pit road duties for the television side. Larry McReynolds provided insight from the Fox Sports studio in Charlotte.

Radio
PRN had the radio call for the race which was simulcasted on Sirius XM NASCAR Radio. Doug Rice and Mark Garrow called the race in the booth when the field raced down the frontstretch. Rob Albright called the race from atop the turn 3 suites when the field raced down the backstretch. Brad Gillie, Brett McMillan, Lenny Batycki and Wendy Venturini covered the action on pit lane for PRN.

Standings after the race

Drivers' Championship standings

Manufacturers' Championship standings

Note: Only the first 16 positions are included for the driver standings.
. – Driver has clinched a position in the NASCAR Cup Series playoffs.

References

Food City Dirt Race
Food City Dirt Race
Food City Dirt Race
NASCAR races at Bristol Motor Speedway